"Ms. Vanity" is the debut single by former Australian Idol contestant Rob Mills. "Ms. Vanity" was released as the lead single from Mills's debut album Up All Night, and peaked at number 6 on the Australian ARIA Singles Chart.

Tracklisting
 "Ms. Vanity" - 3:45
 "The Music" - 3:10
 "Ms. Vanity" (CDRom)

Charts

Certifications

References

2004 songs
2004 debut singles
Sony BMG singles
Songs written by Jim Marr
Songs written by Matthew Gerrard
Song recordings produced by Matthew Gerrard